Ravinderpal Singh (born 14 October 1988) is a Canadian cricketer. In April 2019, he was named in Canada's squad for the 2019 ICC World Cricket League Division Two tournament in Namibia. He made his List A debut for Canada against Papua New Guinea in the 2019 ICC World Cricket League Division Two tournament on 24 April 2019. Prior to his List A debut, he was named in Canada's squad for the 2018–19 ICC T20 World Cup Americas Qualifier tournament in Morrisville, North Carolina.

In June 2019, he was selected to play for the Toronto Nationals franchise team in the 2019 Global T20 Canada tournament.

In August 2019, he was named in Canada's squad for the Regional Finals of the 2018–19 ICC T20 World Cup Americas Qualifier tournament. He made his Twenty20 International (T20I) debut for Canada against the Cayman Islands on 18 August 2019. On debut he scored 101 runs from 48 balls to become the first batsman for Canada to score a century in a T20I match. He was also the first cricketer to score a century on his T20I debut.

In September 2019, he was named in Canada's squad for the 2019 Malaysia Cricket World Cup Challenge League A tournament. In October 2019, he was named in Canada's squad for the 2019 ICC T20 World Cup Qualifier tournament in the United Arab Emirates. 

In October 2020, he was drafted by the Colombo Kings for the inaugural edition of the Lanka Premier League. In October 2021, he was named in Canada's squad for the 2021 ICC Men's T20 World Cup Americas Qualifier tournament in Antigua. In February 2022, he was named in Canada's squad for the 2022 ICC Men's T20 World Cup Global Qualifier A tournament in Oman.

References

External links
 

1988 births
Living people
Canadian cricketers
Canada Twenty20 International cricketers
Place of birth missing (living people)